Liptena similis, the similar liptena, is a butterfly in the family Lycaenidae. It is found in Guinea, Sierra Leone, Liberia, Ivory Coast, Ghana, Nigeria, Cameroon and Gabon.

References

Butterflies described in 1890
Liptena
Butterflies of Africa